André Charles Victor Reille (23 July 1815 in Paris – 19 January 1887 in Antibes) was a French general. Born into a military family, he studied at the  Military School of Saint-Cyr and was a cavalry lieutenant by 1838, captain in 1841, before becoming an aide to General Oudinot, squadron leader in 1851, Lieutenant-Colonel in 1855, colonel in 1859, brigadier general in 1865, and major general in 1875. He was an aide to Napoleon III beginning in 1859 and gave Napoleon's letter of surrender to King William of Prussia at the Battle of Sedan in 1870.

References

1815 births
1887 deaths
People from Antibes
19th-century French diplomats
French generals
French military personnel of the Franco-Prussian War